La Vida Es Un Mus, also known as La Vida Es Un Mus Discos, is an English independent record label specialising in underground punk founded in the London Borough of Hackney in 1999. It has released records by bands from Great Britain and Europe, North and South America, and Asia.

Artists on La Vida Es Un Mus
Anxiety 
Arms Race
Belgrado
Flesh World
Glue
Good Throb
Haram
La Misma
Limp Wrist
Los Crudos
Lumpy and the Dumpers
Nekra
No
Ojo Por Ojo
Orden Mundial
Primetime
Rakta
Rixe
Snob
S.H.I.T.
Straw Man Army 
The Astronauts
The Chisel
The Shitty Limits
Una Bèstia Incontrolable
Woolf

References

Underground punk scene in the United Kingdom
British independent record labels
Record labels established in 1999
Punk record labels
1999 establishments in England